The Hyalogyrinidae is a taxonomic family of sea snails, marine gastropod mollusks in the informal group Lower Heterobranchia.

Genera
Genera within the family Hyalogyrinidae include: 
 † Bandellina Schröder, 1995 
 † Carboninia Bandel, 1996 
 † Doggerostra Gründel, 1998 
 Hyalogyra Marshall, 1988
 Hyalogyrina Marshall, 1988
 Xenoskenea Waren & Gofas in Waren Gofas & Schander, 1993
Synonym
 † Alexogyra Bandel, 1996: synonym of † Bandellina Schröder, 1995

References 

 Warén A. & Bouchet P. (1993) New records, species, genera, and a new family of gastropods from hydrothermal vents and hydrocarbon seeps. Zoologica Scripta 22: 1-90.
 Bouchet P., Rocroi J.P., Hausdorf B., Kaim A., Kano Y., Nützel A., Parkhaev P., Schrödl M. & Strong E.E. (2017). Revised classification, nomenclator and typification of gastropod and monoplacophoran families. Malacologia. 61(1-2): 1-526.
 Haszprunar G., Speimann E., Hawe A. & Hess M. (2011) Interactive 3D anatomy and affinities of the Hyalogyrinidae, basal Heterobranchia (Gastropoda) with a rhipidoglossate radula. Organisms, Diversity & Evolution 11(3): 231-236